Max Henius (June 16, 1859 – November 15, 1935) was a Danish-American biochemist who specialized in the fermentation processes. Max Henius co-founded the American Academy of Brewing in Chicago.

Background
Henius was born in Aalborg, Denmark. His parents were Emilie (née Wasserzug; 1839–1913) and Isidor Henius (1820–1901), both Polish Jewish immigrants. His father, who was born in Thorn, West Prussia, now Torun, Poland, emigrated to Denmark in 1837 and continued his work for spirits distillers to improve and standardise production and later – on January 15, 1846 – co-founded one distillery, Aalborg priviligerede Sirup- og Spritfabrik, that was later, together with several other distilleries, consolidated into De Danske Spritfabrikker in 1881, a Danish distillery which – since 2012 – is part of the Norwegian Arcus Group, which closed the distillery in Aalborg in 2015, moving production to Norway instead. Isidor Henius also owned a small castle in Aalborg, now called Sohngaardsholm Slot. Since 2005, it has been the site of a gourmet restaurant.

Max Henius was educated at the Aalborg Latin School and went on to study at the Polytechnic Institute in Hanover, Germany He attended the University of Marburg, earning his Ph.D. degree in chemistry during 1881. His father sold the distillery that same year. Max Henius subsequently emigrated from Aalborg to the United States in 1881 at the age of 22, settling in Chicago. His younger brother, Erik S. Henius, (1863–1926) remained in Denmark where he was Chairman of the Danish Export Association.

He had another brother, Louis Henius (1870-1938), who was the grandfather of author Suzanne Brøgger.

Career
Initially he was employed by the Northern Pacific Railway on an assignment to test the waters between Fargo, North Dakota, and Bozeman, Montana. In 1886, he opened a drug store. Subsequently he formed Wahl & Henius, an institute for chemical and mechanical analysis, with his former schoolmate, Robert Wahl (1858–1937). Founded in 1891, the Chicago-based American Brewing Academy (later known as the Wahl-Henius Institute of Fermentology) was one of the premier brewing schools of the pre-prohibition era. This institute was later expanded with a brew master school that operated until 1921, after the passage of the Volstead Act in 1919.

At the beginning of the twentieth century, Max Henius became interested in Danish-American organizations in Chicago. Funds were being raised by Danish Americans to purchase  of heather-covered hills, located in part of Rold Forest (Danish: Rold Skov), Denmark's largest forest. In 1912 Max Henius presented the deed to H.M. King Christian X as a permanent memorial from Danish Americans. Rebild National Park (Danish:Rebild Bakker) is today a Danish national park situated near the town of Skørping in Rebild municipality, Region Nordjylland in northern Jutland, Denmark. 

Every July 4 since 1912, except during the two world wars, large crowds have gathered in the heather-covered hills of Rebild to celebrate American Independence Day. On the slope north of Rebild, where the residence of Max Henius was once located, a bust was placed in his memory.

Personal life
He married Danish-born Johanne Louise Heiberg (1860–1934) on June 4, 1883. She was daughter of MD Emil Theodor Heiberg and Johanne (Hanne) Henriette Jacoba Schmidt. They had three children, Henry, Emil, and Gerda. Their great-grandchildren include actors Keith Carradine, Robert Carradine, Christopher Carradine, and Michael Bowen.

Selected works
American liquor code, an outline (1933)
Stepping stones from prohibition (1932)
The error in the National prohibition act (1931)
Modern liquor legislation and systems in Finland, Norway, Denmark and Sweden (1931)
Danish beer & continental beer gardens (1914)
Den danskfødte Amerikaner (1912)
American Handy-Book of the Brewing, Malting and Auxiliary Trades jointly with Robert Wahl (1901)

References

Primary sources
Max Henius, a biography (by Max Henius Memoir Committee. Chicago, 1936)

External links
Rebild National Park Society, Inc.
The Rebild Hills
Sohngaardsholmslot

1859 births
1935 deaths
American people of Polish-Jewish descent
American biochemists
Danish emigrants to the United States
Danish Jews
Danish people of Polish-Jewish descent
Jewish American scientists
People from Aalborg
Scientists from Chicago
Northern Pacific Railway people
American brewers
American pharmacists